The following notable people are or have been associated with Oshkosh, Wisconsin.

Politicians and judiciary

 Harvey R. Abraham, Wisconsin State Assemblyman
 George R. Andrews, U.S. Representative from New York
 Melvin Baldwin, U.S. Representative from Minnesota
 Charles A. Barnard, Wisconsin State Assemblyman
 Coles Bashford, Governor of Wisconsin, U.S. Congressional Delegate from the Arizona Territory
 Martin T. Battis, Wisconsin State Assemblyman and businessman; born in Oshkosh
 Jule Berndt, Wisconsin State Assemblyman and Lutheran pastor; born in Oshkosh
 Gabriel Bouck, Wisconsin Attorney General
 William M. Bray, Wisconsin State Senator
 Richard S. Brown, Chief Judge of the Wisconsin Court of Appeals
 Shirley Brown, Florida State Representative
 Taylor G. Brown, Wisconsin State Senator
 Luther Buxton, New York and Wisconsin state legislator and physician
 Frank Challoner, Wisconsin State Assemblyman and businessman
 William C. Cowling, Wisconsin State Assemblyman
 James H. Davidson, U.S. Representative
 James Edward Doyle, U.S. federal court judge
 James Randall Durfee, U.S. federal court judge
 Edward Eastman, bookseller; first postmaster and first mayor of Oshkosh; Wisconsin State Assemblyman
 William Faber, Wisconsin State Assembly
 Earl Finch, Wisconsin State Assemblyman
 Carlton Foster, Wisconsin State Assemblyman
 Gary R. Goyke, Wisconsin State Senator
 Arthur H. Gruenewald, Wisconsin State Assemblyman
 Richard W. Guenther, U.S. Representative
 Jon R. Guiles, Wisconsin State Assemblyman
 Andrew Haben, Wisconsin state legislator
 Thomas S. Hanson, Wisconsin State Assemblyman
 F. Badger Ives, Wisconsin State Assemblyman and businessman
 Ron Johnson, U.S. Senator for Wisconsin
 Frank B. Keefe, U.S. Representative
 Emil Keup, Wisconsin State Assemblyman
 Gaines A. Knapp, Wisconsin State Assemblyman
 Kenneth Kunde, Wisconsin State Assemblyman
 Florian Lampert, U.S. Representative
 B. F. Langworthy, Minnesota State Representative
 Alfred R. Lea, Wisconsin State Assemblyman
 Frank A. Leach, Wisconsin State Assemblyman
 Freeman Lord, Wisconsin State Assemblyman
Gustav S. Luscher, Wisconsin State Assemblyman
 Herman E. Manuel, Wisconsin State Assemblyman
 Lucas Miltiades Miller, U.S. Representative
 Bernard N. Moran, Wisconsin State Senator
 Reid F. Murray, U.S. Representative
 Leo T. Niemuth, Wisconsin State Assemblyman
 Alvin O'Konski, U.S. Representative
 Albert L. Osborn, Wisconsin State Assemblyman
 Clark M. Perry, Wisconsin State Assemblyman
 Leander J. Pierson, Wisconsin State Assemblyman
 George White Pratt, Wisconsin State Senator
 Charles Rahr, Wisconsin State Assemblyman
 Christian Sarau, Wisconsin State Senator
 Philetus Sawyer, politician
 Casper Schmidt, Wisconsin State Assemblyman
 Edward M. Schneider, Wisconsin State Assemblyman
 Chester D. Seftenberg, Wisconsin State Assemblyman
 Floyd E. Shurbert, Wisconsin State Assemblyman
 Eber Simpson, Wisconsin State Assemblyman
 Janet Dempsey Steiger, politician
 William A. Steiger, U.S. Representative
 Walter Tank, Wisconsin State Assemblyman
 Return Torrey, miller and Wisconsin state senator
 Gregg Underheim, politician
 Robert Scadden Vessey, Governor of South Dakota
 Esther K. Walling, Wisconsin State Assemblywoman
 Thomas Wall, Wisconsin businessman and state legislator
 Ganem W. Washburn, Wisconsin State Senator and jurist
 Henry I. Weed, Wisconsin State Senator
 Dayne Wescott, Wisconsin State Senator
 Edwin Wheeler, Wisconsin State Senator and jurist
 Alexander B. Whitman, Wisconsin State Senator

Sportspersons

Marty Below, member of the College Football Hall of Fame (1988)
 Cozy Dolan, MLB player
 Dick Erdlitz, NFL player
 Bill Gogolewski, MLB player
 Rudy Gollomb, NFL player
 Tyrese Haliburton, NBA player
 Billy Hoeft, MLB player
 Hornswoggle, real name Dylan Postl, wrestler
 Peter Konz, NFL player
 Howie Koplitz, MLB player
 Hal Reilly, MLB player
 Dutch Rennert, Major League Baseball umpire
 Ted Richards, NFL player
 Hal Robl, NFL player
 Champ Seibold, NFL player
 Eber Simpson, NFL player
 Len Smith, NFL player
 Dave Tyriver, MLB player

Military
 Harold Medberry Bemis, U.S. Navy admiral
 Charles R. Boardman, served as Adjutant General of Wisconsin and as an American general during WWI
 Edmond Konrad, U.S. Navy admiral
 Ernest Dichmann Peek, U.S. Army Major General
 William Everett Potter, U.S. Army; served as Governor of the Panama Canal Zone
 Steven A. Schaick, U.S. Air Force general; Deputy Chief of Chaplains

Others

 Lee Baxandall, founder of The Naturist Society
 Erin Boheme, musician
 Michelle Grabner, painter
 Mark Gruenwald, Marvel Comics executive editor
 Lewis Hine, photographer
 Jessie Jack Hooper, suffragist, peace activist, first president of the Wisconsin League of Women Voters and Democratic candidate for U.S. Senate 
 KennyHoopla, musician 
 Arthur C. Lichtenberger, presiding Bishop of the Episcopal Church
 Kevin B. MacDonald, evolutionary psychologist at the California State University, Long Beach
 Helen Farnsworth Mears, sculptor
 Mike Melvoin, jazz pianist
 Paul Poberezny, aircraft designer, military aviator and founder of the Experimental Aircraft Association, member of the National Aviation Hall of Fame (1999)
 Tom Poberezny, aerobatic pilot and former chairman and president of the Experimental Aircraft Association, member of the National Aviation Hall of Fame (2016)
 Stevie Rachelle, lead singer of Tuff
 T.J. Rodgers, scientist and entrepreneur
 Cora Folsom Salisbury, vaudeville performer and ragtime composer
 Greg Dean Schmitz, film critic
 Kathie Sullivan, singer
 Baby Doe Tabor, Colorado pioneer
 Dave Truesdale, editor and literary critic
 Jim VandeHei, editor and co-founder of Politico

References

Oshkosh
Oshkosh, Wisconsin